Gamers' Day is a gaming exhibition held every year in Riyadh, Saudi Arabia. It is one of the largest gaming exhibitions for gamers in Saudi Arabia and around GCC. Gamers' Day started in Saudi Arabia in 2008. Every year it has had a high number of visitors and exhibitors. New games are introduced during the exhibition. Gamers' Day provides a unique gaming experience to visitors.

Activities
Activities conducted during the exhibition include:
 Upcoming games showcasing
 PS and accessories showcasing
 Stage activities and performers
 Competitions and tournaments

References

Further reading 
 http://saudigamer.com/gamers-day-2015-discussion/
 http://www.true-gaming.net/home/276954/
 https://web.archive.org/web/20150902000414/http://www.ng4a.com/2015/08/post/394655
 http://z-pad.net/sony-gamers-day-announcement/
 http://www.tech-wd.com/wd/2015/09/05

External links 
  

Video game trade shows
Video gaming in Saudi Arabia